Icosium tomentosum is a species of beetle in the family Cerambycidae, the only species in the genus Icosium.

References

Achrysonini